Stary Sielc  is a village in the administrative district of Gmina Rzewnie, within Maków County, Masovian Voivodeship, in east-central Poland.

The village has a population of 137.

References

Stary Sielc